Kurukshetra Shiva Temple is a Hindu temple dedicated to the deity Shiva, located at Kurukshetra in Haryana, India.

Vaippu Sthalam
It is one of the shrines of the Vaippu Sthalams sung by Tamil Saivite Nayanar Sundarar.

Presiding deity
The presiding deity in the garbhagriha, is represented by the lingam. In the rear side the sculpture of Kunti, who worshipped the deity is found.

Specialities
This place gave Bhagavad Gita. It has the longest tank in India. This place is also known as Dharmakshetra, Brahmashetra, Aryavardha and Uthiravedi.

Location
Kurukshetra can be reached from New Delhi by train or bus.

References

Hindu temples in Haryana
Shiva temples in Haryana